This article details the list of women's singles Grand Slam tournaments tennis champions. Some major changes have taken place in history and have affected the number of titles that have been won by various players. These have included the opening of the French national championships to international players in 1925, the elimination of the challenge round in 1922, and the admission of professional players in 1968 (the start of the Open Era). Since then, 58 women have won at least one grand slam.

All of these tournaments have been listed based on the modern definition of a tennis major, rather than when they were officially recognized by the ILTF. The Australian, French Championships, and U.S. tournaments were officially recognized by the ILTF in 1924, though the French Championships were not played in 1924 because of the Olympics. The United States Lawn Tennis Association (USLTA) had several grievances with the ILTF and refused to join when it was formed in 1913.

From 1913 to 1923 there were three official championships recognized by the ILTF:
 World Grass Court Championships – Wimbledon.
 World Hard Court Championships, held in Paris on clay courts.
 World Covered Court Championships, held in Europe on an indoor wood surface.

During that same time period the USLTA recognized the U.S. National Championships and did not recognize any world championship.
 U.S. National Championships, held in New York on grass.

Champions by year

Champions list 
Tournament record and active players indicated in bold.

 128 players have won at least one of the 453 majors that have been played.

Grand Slam titles by decade 

1880s

1890s

1900s

1910s

1920s

1930s

1940s

1950s

1960s

1970s

1980s

1990s

2000s

2010s

2020s

Grand Slam achievements 

These are players who achieved some form of a tennis Grand Slam. They include a Grand Slam, non-calendar year Grand Slam, Career Grand Slam, Career Golden Slam, and Career Super Slam. No able-bodied player has won a single season Super Slam. The tennis Open Era began in 1968, after the Australian Open and before the French Open.

Grand Slam 
Players who held all four Grand Slam titles simultaneously (in a calendar year).

Non-calendar year Grand Slam 
Players who held all four Grand Slam titles simultaneously (not in a calendar year). 
From 1977 to 1985, the Australian Open was the last major tournament held in a season.

Career Grand Slam
Players who won all four Grand Slam titles over the course of their careers. 
Until 1977 the 4 Slams were played on 2 different surfaces (grass, clay). After 1978 they were contested on 3.
 The event at which the Career Grand Slam was completed indicated in bold.

Golden Slam 
Players who held all four Grand Slam titles and the Olympic gold medal simultaneously.

Career Golden Slam 
Players who won all four Grand Slam titles and the Olympic gold medal over the course of their careers.
 The event at which the Career Golden Slam was completed indicated in bold.

Career Super Slam 
Players who won all four Grand Slam titles, the Olympic gold medal and the year-end championship over the course of their careers.
 The event at which the Career Super Slam was completed indicated in bold.

Multiple titles in a season

Three titles

Two titles

Tournament statistics

Most titles per tournament

Consecutive titles

Overall record

At one tournament

Grand Slam titles by country

All-time

Open era

Notes

See also

List of Grand Slam records lists 
 Chronological list of women's Grand Slam tennis champions
 List of Grand Slam women's singles finals
 List of Grand Slam-related tennis records
 List of WTA Tour top-level tournament singles champions
 Lists of tennis records and statistics

List of Grand Slam champions 
 List of Grand Slam men's singles champions
 List of Grand Slam men's doubles champions
 List of Grand Slam women's doubles champions
 List of Grand Slam mixed doubles champions
 List of Grand Slam boys' singles champions
 List of Grand Slam girls' singles champions
 List of wheelchair tennis champions

References

Women